Johannes Dyba (15 September 1929 – 23 July 2000) was a German prelate of the Catholic Church who led the Diocese of Fulda from 1983 until his death. He spent his earlier career in the diplomatic service of the Holy See.

Biography
Johannes Dyba was born in Berlin, Germany, on 15 September 1929. He was ordained a priest on 2 February 1959.

To prepare for a diplomatic career he entered the Pontifical Ecclesiastical Academy in 1960.

On 25 August 1979, Pope John Paul II named him a titular archbishop, Apostolic Pro-Nuncio to Gambia and to Liberia, and Apostolic Delegate to Guinea and to Sierra Leone. He received his episcopal consecration from Cardinal Agostino Casaroli on 13 October 1979.

On 1 June 1983, Pope John Paul named him Bishop of Fulda, allowing him to continue to use the personal title of Archbishop.

On 15 December 1990, Dyba was appointed Military Ordinary of Germany.

Dyba died in Fulda of heart failure on 23 July 2000.

Notes

References

Further reading

External links
Catholic Hierarchy: Archbishop Johannes Dyba 

1929 births
2000 deaths
Pontifical Ecclesiastical Academy alumni
Apostolic Nuncios to the Gambia
Apostolic Nuncios to Guinea
Apostolic Nuncios to Liberia
Apostolic Nuncios to Sierra Leone
Roman Catholic bishops of Fulda
Clergy from Berlin
Commanders Crosses of the Order of Merit of the Federal Republic of Germany
20th-century German Roman Catholic priests